The 1987 BYU Cougars football team represented Brigham Young University during the 1987 NCAA Division I-A football season. The Cougars were led by 16th-year head coach LaVell Edwards and played their home games at Cougar Stadium in Provo, Utah. The team competed as members of the Western Athletic Conference, finishing in second with a record of 9–4 (7–1 WAC). BYU was invited to the All-American Bowl, where they were defeated by Virginia. The Cougars also participated in a rare college football game played outside the United States, in a regular season finale against Colorado State played in Melbourne, Australia. The game was promoted as the "Melbourne Bowl" but was met with weak enthusiasm in Australia.

Schedule

Personnel

Season summary

at Texas

Air Force

References

BYU
BYU Cougars football seasons
BYU Cougars football